Susegana is a comune (municipality) in the Province of Treviso in the Italian region Veneto, located about  north of Venice and about  north of Treviso.

History
Traces of human presence from the late Bronze Age have been found in Susegana area. During the Roman age it was crossed by the Via Claudia Augusta, with the likely presence of some settlements near it. After the fall of the Western Roman Empire, the area was conquered by the Lombards; later the abbey of Follina acquired the area and favoured its flourishment. In the 12th century a castle was founded on a hill by the counts of Treviso (later of Collalto), also of Lombard origin. In 1245 counts received another hill, that of San Salvatore, by the commune of Treviso, and built here another fortress.

In 1806, during the French occupation of Italy, a commune named San Salvador was established here, which later received the current name of Susegana. The centre was badly damaged by bombings during World War I. After the 1960s, it expanded as an industrial centre thanks to the Zanussi plant (modern Electrolux), producing home appliances.

Main sights
The Church of Visitazione della Beata Vergine (13th century, rebuilt most likely in the 15th century) houses an altarpiece by Il Pordenone (16th century) and 15th frescoes, rediscovered after restorations begun in 1984. It was damaged during World War I, and later restored.

It was later enlarged and embellished, receiving the 17th century Palazzo Odoardo. It was nearly destroyed in the course of World War I by the Italian artillery, after the route of Caporetto.

Remains of a Roman bridge, the Susegana Bridge, are on the Piave river and the Crevada stream.

References

External links
 Official website

Cities and towns in Veneto
Castles in Italy